The blue-capped ifrit (Ifrita kowaldi), also known as the blue-capped ifrita, is a small and insectivorous passerine species currently placed in the monotypic family, Ifritidae. Previously, the ifrit has been placed in a plethora of families including Cinclosomatidae or Monarchidae. Blue-capped ifrits are considered an ancient relict species endemic to New Guinea. This corvoid species originally dates back to the Oligocene epoch, on a series of proto-Papuan islands, with minimal known evolutionary divergences.

Description
The blue-capped ifrit is 16–17 cm (6.3–6.7 in) long and weighs 34-36 g (1.2–1.3 oz). Species plumage is yellowish brown with a blue-black crown atop their broad head. It is a sexually dimorphic species, with ear streak coloration being white in males and more tawny yellow in females. Ifrits tend to have more stout body shapes with broad sternums and shallow keels. Their wings are short and rounded while their legs are booted, having feathers down to their stout and clawed feet. Additionally, blue-capped ifrits have batrachotoxin within their feathers and skin.

Distribution and habitat
Blue-capped ifrits are endemic to New Guinea and Papua New Guinea, being found nowhere else on earth and having a distribution of 388,000 km2. Ifrits inhabit montane rainforest of New Guinea, living in altitude ranges of 1,000–4,000 meters (3,280–13,123 feet) above sea level. Typically, they are found at altitudes of 1,500 meters (4,921 feet) or above.

Behaviour and ecology 
As birds with weak flight abilities, blue-capped ifrits build nests about 1–3 meters (3–10 feet) above the ground in the branches of denser rainforest vegetation. These nests are made of plant fibers with some feathers. The parents tend to camouflage the outside of the nest with moss and liverworts. Ifrits lay small clutches with a typical nest containing only a single offspring. The nest camouflage, toxin excretion, and small clutch sizes may have derived from historically high rates of depredation and nest parasitism.

Toxin
Blue-capped ifrits are among a small group of avian species that are poisonous, the others being the little shrikethrush (Colluricincla), and several members of the Pitohui, also from New Guinea. Ifrits excrete batrachotoxin into their feathers and skin in order to defend themselves against predators. Generally, batrachotoxin binds and permanently opens the sodium channels in nerve cells and can cause paralysis. The accumulation of toxins varies in individuals based on the region they are found in and this could be due to the availability of Choresine beetles, which are speculated to be the dietary source of the toxin itself.

Conservation status 
Ifrits are of least concern because they have a large range. Ifrits seem to have stable population and are thought to have quite a large population size. Part of their range lies within conservation sites.

See also
Batrachotoxin
Toxic bird

References

Bibliography
 del Hoyo, J.; Elliot, A. & Christie D. (editors). (2007). Handbook of the Birds of the World. Volume 12: Picathartes to Tits and Chickadees. Lynx Edicions.

External links 
 BirdLife Species Factsheet
 The Intoxicating Birds of New Guinea by John Tidwell

Bird families
Birds of New Guinea
blue-capped ifrit
blue-capped ifrit
Endemic fauna of New Guinea
Toxic birds